is a railway station in Adachi, Tokyo, Japan, operated by the Tokyo subway operator Tokyo Metro.

Lines
Kita-Ayase Station forms the terminus of the 24 km Tokyo Metro Chiyoda Line from Yoyogi-uehara Station, as of March 16, 2019.

Station layout
The station has a single elevated side platform serving one track. The platform is now 10 cars long.

Platform

History
Kita-Ayase Station opened on 20 December 1979.  

The station facilities were inherited by Tokyo Metro after the privatization of the Teito Rapid Transit Authority (TRTA) in 2004.

The station underwent rebuilding work to extend the platforms approximately  toward Ayase Station to allow ten-car through trains to operate to and from the main Chiyoda Line. New station entrances were also added. 10 car service began on March 16, 2019.

Passenger statistics
In fiscal 2011, the station was used by an average of 25,225 passengers daily.

References

External links

 Tokyo Metro station information 

Railway stations in Tokyo
Railway stations in Japan opened in 1979
Tokyo Metro Chiyoda Line